Lipianki may refer to the following places:
Lipianki, Łódź Voivodeship (central Poland)
Lipianki, Masovian Voivodeship (east-central Poland)
Lipianki, Pomeranian Voivodeship (north Poland)